Overbrook Elementary School is a historic elementary school in the Overbrook neighborhood of Philadelphia, Pennsylvania. It is part of the School District of Philadelphia. The building was built in 1905–1907, and is a two-story, nine-bay brick building faced with granite in the Colonial Revival-style. It sits on a raised basement. An eight-bay addition designed by Henry deCourcy Richards was built in 1913–1914. It features a slightly projecting front gable.

The building was added to the National Register of Historic Places in 1988.

References

External links

School buildings on the National Register of Historic Places in Philadelphia
Colonial Revival architecture in Pennsylvania
School buildings completed in 1914
Overbrook, Philadelphia
School District of Philadelphia
Public elementary schools in Philadelphia
1914 establishments in Pennsylvania